The action of 6 July 1746 was an inconclusive naval engagement between the British and French fleets during the War of the Austrian Succession.

Battle
The English fleet, first under the command of Commodore Curtis Barnett and then Edward Peyton, and a French fleet under Bertrand-François Mahé de La Bourdonnais, engaged each other early in the First Carnatic War.  Both fleets were damaged, with La Bourdonnais putting in at Pondicherry for repairs, and Peyton at Trincomalee.  La Bourdonnais acquired additional guns at Pondicherry, and when the fleets met again in August 1746, Peyton refused battle and retreated to Bengal.  La Bourdonnais then proceeded to lead the successful French attack on Madras in September.

Order of Battle

Royal Navy

France

Citations

References

 
Dodwell, Dupleix and Clive
The Navy in the War of 1739–1748

Naval battles involving France
Naval battles involving Great Britain
Conflicts in 1746
1746 in India
First Carnatic War
History of Tamil Nadu